Abbey Road most commonly refers to the eleventh studio album by The Beatles.

Abbey Road may also refer to:

Places
Abbey Road, Barrow-in-Furness, the main road running through Barrow-in-Furness, England, United Kingdom
Abbey Road, London, a street in North London, England, United Kingdom after which the album was named
Abbey Road DLR station, an East London station on the Docklands Light Railway

Arts, entertainment, and media
"Abbey Road", a song by Tori Amos
Abbey Road E.P., an EP by Spiritualized
Abbey Road on the River, the largest Beatles festival in the United States
Abbey Road Studios, an EMI recording studio, named after the street, which opened in 1931
Live from Abbey Road, a recurring music television programme broadcast by More4
"SYRE on Abbey Road", a song by Jaden Smith
The Abbey Road E.P., an EP by Red Hot Chili Peppers

See also
The Abbey Road Sessions (disambiguation)